Matti Erkki Olavi Murto (9 April 1949 - 19 August 2013) was a professional ice hockey player who played in the SM-liiga. He played for HIFK. He was inducted into the Finnish Hockey Hall of Fame in 1991.

External links
 Finnish Hockey Hall of Fame bio

1949 births
2013 deaths
Finnish ice hockey players
HIFK (ice hockey) players
Ice hockey players at the 1972 Winter Olympics
Ice hockey players at the 1976 Winter Olympics
Olympic ice hockey players of Finland
Ice hockey people from Helsinki
Ice hockey players with retired numbers